Carrickmore railway station can mean:

 Carrickmore railway station (County Donegal), in Carrickmore, County Donegal, Ireland
 Carrickmore railway station (Northern Ireland), in Carrickmore, County Tyrone, Northern Ireland